Bala Təklə (also, Bala Teklya and Niahnyaya Taklya) is a village and municipality in the Masally Rayon of Azerbaijan.  It has a population of 469.

References 

Populated places in Masally District